Wentworth was a federal electoral district represented in the House of Commons of Canada from 1904 to 1968. It was located near the City of Hamilton in the province of Ontario. This riding was first created in 1903 from parts of Wentworth North and Brant and Wentworth South ridings.

Wentworth initially consisted of the county of Wentworth, excluding of the city of Hamilton. In 1914, it was expanded to include those portions of the city of Hamilton not included in Hamilton East and Hamilton West ridings.

In 1947, it was redefined to consist of the county of Wentworth (excluding the townships of Beverly, Ancaster, Glanford and Binbrook), and the northern part the city of Hamilton. In 1952, it was again defined as being the county of Wentworth, excluding the city of Hamilton.

The electoral district was abolished in 1966 when it was redistributed between Halton—Wentworth, Hamilton Mountain, Hamilton—Wentworth and Wellington ridings.

Members of Parliament

This riding elected the following members of the House of Commons of Canada:

Election results

|- 
  
|Conservative
|E. D. Smith
|align="right"|2,899 
  
|Liberal
|William Oscar Sealey 
|align="right"| 2,889   
|}

|- 
  
|Conservative
|E. D. Smith 
|align="right"| 2,982 
  
|Liberal
|William Oscar Sealey 
|align="right"| 2,965
|}

|- 
  
|Liberal
|William Oscar Sealey
|align="right"| 3,307 
  
|Conservative
|William Hall Ptolemy
|align="right"| 2,961    
|}

|- 
  
|Conservative
|Gordon Crooks Wilson
|align="right"| 3,832 
  
|Liberal
|William Oscar Sealey
|align="right"| 2,939   
|}

|- 
  
|Government (Unionist)
|Gordon Crooks Wilson
|align="right"| 9,070 
  
|Opposition (Laurier Liberals)
|John Herbert Dickenson 
|align="right"|3,387 

|Labour
|Frederick James Flatman
|align="right"| 1,507    
|}

|- 
  
|Conservative
|Gordon Crooks Wilson
|align="right"| 9,375 

  
|Liberal
|Walter Thompson Evans
|align="right"| 3,177
|}

|- 
  
|Conservative
|Gordon Crooks Wilson 
|align="right"| 12,970 

|}

|- 
  
|Conservative
|Gordon Crooks Wilson
|align="right"| 10,975 
  
|Liberal
|Harold Stanley Burns
|align="right"| 5,335   
|}

|- 
  
|Conservative
|Gordon Crooks Wilson 
|align="right"|13,436 
  
|Liberal
|Frank Campbell Biggs
|align="right"| 9,628 
 
|Unknown
|Samuel Radcliffe Weaver
|align="right"| 1,630   
|}

|- 
  
|Conservative
|Frank Lennard  
|align="right"|  9,958
  
|Liberal
|Ellis Corman
|align="right"| 9,740 

 
|Co-operative Commonwealth
|Robert James Hanna 
|align="right"| 4,513    
|}

|- 
  
|Liberal
|Ellis Corman  
|align="right"| 15,714 
  
|National Government
|Frank Lennard  
|align="right"| 14,949 
|}

|- 
  
|Progressive Conservative
|Frank Lennard 
|align="right"| 15,458 
  
|Liberal
|Ellis Corman  
|align="right"|  13,652 
 
|Co-operative Commonwealth
|John O'Hanley
|align="right"| 11,914   
|}

|- 
  
|Progressive Conservative
|Frank Lennard  
|align="right"|16,443 
  
|Liberal
|Henry Arnott Hicks
|align="right"| 13,312 
 
|Co-operative Commonwealth
| David Lewis  
|align="right"| 11,638 

 
|Independent
|Charles Giles
|align="right"|562    
|}

|- 
  
|Progressive Conservative
|Frank Lennard  
|align="right"| 10,476 
  
|Liberal
|Reginald Wheeler
|align="right"| 7,700 
 
|Co-operative Commonwealth
|Isaac Reginald Gardiner
|align="right"| 3,915  
|}

|- 
  
|Progressive Conservative
|Frank Lennard  
|align="right"| 19,037 
  
|Liberal
|Edwin Delbert Hickey
|align="right"|  8,922 
 
|Co-operative Commonwealth
|John Joseph Zuliniak 
|align="right"|  4,905 
|}

|- 
  
|Progressive Conservative
|Frank Lennard 
|align="right"| 23,854 
  
|Liberal
|William Kitchen Dunham
|align="right"| 7,578 
 
|Co-operative Commonwealth
|John Joseph Zuliniak
|align="right"|4,972   
|}

|- 
  
|Progressive Conservative
|Joseph Reed Sams
|align="right"| 17,050 
  
|Liberal
|John B. Morison  
|align="right"| 16,434 
 
|New Democratic
|John Joseph Zuliniak 
|align="right"|16,434 

|}

|- 
  
|Liberal
|John B. Morison 
|align="right"|  18,589 
  
|Progressive Conservative
|Joseph Reed Sams
|align="right"|17,640 
 
|New Democratic
|Harry Pomeroy 
|align="right"|8,088   
|}

|- 
  
|Liberal
|John B. Morison 
|align="right"| 17,746 
  
|Progressive Conservative
|Joseph Reed Sams 
|align="right"| 15,991 
 
|New Democratic
|Reginald Gardiner
|align="right"|13,735

|}

See also 

 List of Canadian federal electoral districts
 Past Canadian electoral districts

External links 

 Website of the Parliament of Canada

Former federal electoral districts of Ontario